Turku Air was a Finnish regional airline and air taxi company founded 1974. Turku Air had several Piper PA-31-350 airplanes and operated scheduled flights between Turku, Mariehamn and Tallinn as well as chartered cargo and air taxi services.

External links

References

Defunct airlines of Finland
Airlines established in 1974
Airlines disestablished in 2016
Finnish companies established in 1974
1974 establishments in Finland
2016 disestablishments in Finland